T.G. Lee Dairy is a dairy company founded in 1925 that produces dairy products for the U.S. state of Florida. The company's headquarters is in Orlando, and it is a regional brand of Dean Foods.

Its founder, Thomas Gilbert Lee (1894-1986), initially started the company to produce dairy products for Central Florida. Today, there are T.G. Lee processing plants across the state, and its various dairy products are sold in supermarkets, convenience stores, restaurants, and institutional food service operations. It was one of the first dairy farms in Florida to use artificial cattle breeding techniques.

The area of independent businesses around the T.G. Lee Dairy main headquarters is known colloquially as "The Milk District."

T.G. Lee is also known for its iconic yellow-plastic milk containers, which are designed to help promote and preserve milk quality, and protect minerals and vitamins in the milk from the effects of constant exposure to sunlight which can cause faster spoiling in milk than normal. Scientific studies have shown that this claim is accurate.

References

External links
 

Dairy products companies of the United States
American companies established in 1925
Food and drink companies established in 1925
Companies based in Orlando, Florida
Dean Foods brands
1925 establishments in Florida
Companies that filed for Chapter 11 bankruptcy in 2019